is a railway station in the city of Ōmachi, Nagano Prefecture, Japan, operated by East Japan Railway Company (JR East).

Lines
Azumi-Kutsukake Station is served by the Ōito Line and is 28.6 kilometers from the terminus of the line at Matsumoto Station.

Station layout
The station consists of one ground-level side platform serving a single bi-directional track. The station is unattended.

History
It was renamed to its present name on 1 June 1937. With the privatization of Japanese National Railways (JNR) on 1 April 1987, the station came under the control of JR East. The station building was remodelled in 2007.

Surrounding area
Takase River

Nishina Shinmei Shrine

See also
List of railway stations in Japan

References

External links

 JR East station information 

Railway stations in Nagano Prefecture
Ōito Line
Railway stations in Japan opened in 1915
Stations of East Japan Railway Company
Ōmachi, Nagano